Satna (सतना) Lok Sabha constituency is one of the 29 Lok Sabha constituencies in Madhya Pradesh state in central India. This constituency presently covers the entire Satna district of the state.

Assembly segments
Presently, Satna Lok Sabha constituency comprises the following seven Vidhan Sabha (Legislative Assembly) segments:

Members of Parliament

Election results

See also
 Satna district
 List of Constituencies of the Lok Sabha

References

External links
Satna lok sabha  constituency election 2019 result details

Lok Sabha constituencies in Madhya Pradesh
Satna district